Annaberg-Buchholz is a town in Saxony, Germany. Lying in the Ore Mountains, it is the capital of the district of Erzgebirgskreis.

Geography
The town is located in the Ore Mountains, at the side of the Pöhlberg ( above sea level).

History

The previously heavily forested upper Ore Mountains were settled in the 12th and 13th centuries by Franconian farmers. Frohnau, Geyersdorf, and Kleinrückerswalde—all now part of present-day town—have all been attested since 1397.

Barbara Uthmann introduced braid and lace-making to the town in 1561 and the craft was further developed in the 1590s by Belgian refugees fleeing the policies of Fernando Álvarez de Toledo, 3rd Duke of Alba, Spain's governor over the Low Countries. The industry was further developed in the 19th century, when Annaberg and Buchholz were connected by rail to Chemnitz and to each other, with both settlements having specialized schools for lace-making. The population of Annaberg in the 1870s was 11,693. This had risen to 16,811 by 1905, with another 9,307 in Buchholz.

The town's mines formerly produced silver, tin, and cobalt, but ceased production before the First World War. After the Reunification of Germany in 1989, some were restored for viewing by tourists.

In 1945, the two towns Annaberg and Buchholz merged into the new town Annaberg-Buchholz. From 1952 to 1990, Annaberg-Buchholz was part of the Bezirk Karl-Marx-Stadt of East Germany.

Historical population 
At the start of the 16th Century, Annaberg was one of the largest towns in Germany with an estimated 8,000 inhabitants. In 1834 Annaberg had a population of 5,068 and Buchholz with 1,424. In 1875, 11,693 people lived in Annaberg, in 1890 11,725, in 1925 18,204, and in 1933 19,818. The figures in the table are for Annaberg-Buchholz.

Historical population (from 1960, on 31 December):

 Before 1945: Sum of population of towns Annaberg and BuchholzData source 1998: Statistical Office of Saxony
1 29 October
2 31 August

Main sights

The area is a tourist destination and ski resort. The Ore Mountains are referred to as Land of Christmas and famous for the Christmas Markets and the carved sculptures. Annaberg has a Roman Catholic church and three Protestant churches, among them St. Anne's (built 1499-1525), which is the largest of its kind in Saxony. There are public monuments to Luther, the famous mathematician Adam Ries, and Barbara Uthmann. Buchholz had another Gothic Protestant church and monuments to Frederick the Wise and Bismarck. Annaberg is well known for its historical old town and market square; the house Markt 2 shows the coat of arms of the family Apian-Bennewitz.

Museums 
 Adam Ries Museum and Annaberg School of Accountancy (Rechenschule)
 Ore Mountain Museum and Im Gößner visitor mine
 Manufaktur der Träume
 Markus-Röhling-Stolln visitor mine at Frohnau
 Dorothea-Stolln visitor mine at Cunersdorf

Frohnauer Hammer 

The Frohnauer Hammer is a historic and fully working preserved hammer mill in the village of Frohnau within the municipality. In 1907, it was declared a technical monument and, since then, has been open to the public. In addition to the actual hammer mill itself, there is an exhibition of forged items and the former master hammersmith's house (Hammerherrenhaus).

Regular events 
 An annual high point in early summer is the largest folk festival in the region, the Annaberger Kät.
 Every two years in August the Abbey Festival takes place in the ruins of Annaberg Abbey]
 The Annaberg Christmas Market is widely known outside the region and closes on the fourth week in advent with the world's biggest miners' parade (Bergparade).

Twin towns – sister cities

Annaberg-Buchholz is twinned with:
 Chomutov, Czech Republic
 Paide, Estonia
 Weiden in der Oberpfalz, Germany

Gallery

Notable people 
 Gabriel Zwilling (1487–1558), Lutheran theologian and reformer
 Erasmus Sarcerius (1501-1559), Lutheran theologian and reformer
 Barbara Uthmann (1514–1575), born of Elterlein, entrepreneur

 Paul Jenisch (1551–1612), educator and theologian
 David Fletcher (1646–1716), Privy Councillor of Commerce and landowner
 Gottfried Arnold Irenaeus called (1666–1714), poet
 Christian Felix Weiße (1726–1804), founder of the German Children's Literature
 Bernhard Eisenstuck (1805–1871), entrepreneur and politician
 Peter Gast alias Peter Guest (1854–1918), composer, writer, associate of Friedrich Nietzsche and dialect poet
 Walter König (1878–1964), professor of chemistry
 Theodor Korselt (1891–1943), lawyer and Nazi victim
 Paul Schneider (1892–1975), woodcarver
 Erich Lorenz (1894–1981), local historian, folklorist, historian and collector of biographies
 Carl Friedrich Claus (1930–1998), graphic artist, poet and philosopher
 Frank Wiegand (born 1943), swimmer
 Matthias Herget (born 1955), football player
 Evelin Jahl born Schlaak (born 1956), discus thrower
 Ute Noack (born 1961), cross-country skier
 Yvonne Mai-Graham (born 1965), middle-distance runner
 Kathrin Weßel (born 1967), long-distance runner
 Viola Bauer (born 1976), cross-country skier
 Anke Wischnewski (born 1978), luger
 Christel Loetzsch (born 1986), mezzo-soprano
 Eric Frenzel (born 1988), Nordic Combined skier

Notes

References

External links
 

 
Erzgebirgskreis